Golden City Township is a township in Barton County, Missouri, USA.  As of the 2000 census, its population was 1,271.

Geography
The township contains one incorporated settlement, Golden City, from which its name is derived. According to the USGS, it contains one cemetery, Harlow-Wright. However, there is another cemetery located in the township, the Golden City IOOF Cemetery, just north of Golden City.

The stream of Kyle Creek runs through this township.

References

 USGS Geographic Names Information System (GNIS)

External links
 US-Counties.com
 City-Data.com

Townships in Barton County, Missouri
Townships in Missouri